Joe Howe may refer to:

 Joseph Howe (1804–1873), Nova Scotian journalist, politician and public servant
 Joe Howe (footballer) (born 1988), English footballer